Trevat, Texas was a farming community 12 miles from Groveton in Trinity County, Texas.  It was established around the time of the American Civil War.  There was a post office from 1892 until 1927. The community was deserted by 1990.

References

TREVAT, TX at the Handbook of Texas Online

Unincorporated communities in Trinity County, Texas
Unincorporated communities in Texas